Eric Junior Bocat (born 16 July 1999) is a French professional footballer who plays as a defender for Belgian First Division A club Sint-Truiden.

Career statistics

References 

1999 births
Living people
French footballers
French expatriate footballers
Association football defenders
Dijon FCO players
Stade Brestois 29 players
Lille OSC players
Royal Excel Mouscron players
Sint-Truidense V.V. players
Championnat National 3 players
Championnat National 2 players
Belgian Pro League players
Challenger Pro League players
French expatriate sportspeople in Belgium
Expatriate footballers in Belgium